John Hock is an artist, arts administrator, artist advocate, and champion of the arts. He is the founder and Director of NE Sculpture Gallery Factory and the Social Justice BillBoard Project, both in Minneapolis, MN.

He was born and grew up in Washington, D.C.  In addition, Hock is the chief curator and manager for the City of St. Paul's Western Sculpture Park for PUBLIC ART SAINT PAUL. As a sculptor, Hock has large-scale abstract sculptures in collections and public sculpture parks around the U.S. and England.  He has received numerous fellowships and awards from the National Foundation for the Advancement of Arts, New York Foundation for the Arts, McKnight Foundation Individual Artists Grant, Athena Foundation, and the Pollock-Krasner Foundation Award.

Hock is the founding director and former Artistic Director of Franconia Sculpture Park in Franconia, Minnesota. He also co-founded the City of Poughkeepsie Sculpture Park in New York.

References 

American sculptors
Living people
Year of birth missing (living people)